Shahrak-e Farzadshahr (also Romanized as Shahrak-e Farzādshahr) is a village in Emamzadeh Abdollah Rural District, Dehferi District, Fereydunkenar County, Mazandaran Province, Iran. At the 2006 census, its population was 481, in 133 families.

References 

Populated places in Fereydunkenar County